Sarvadarśanasaṃgraha (सर्वदर्शनसंग्रह) ('A Compendium of all the Philosophical Systems') is a philosophical text by the 14th-century Indian scholar Mādhavāchārya. In the book, Mādhavāchārya reviews the sixteen philosophical systems current in India at the time, and gives what appeared to him to be their most important tenets, and the principal arguments by which their followers endeavoured to maintain them. Mādhavāchārya is usually identified with Vidyaranya, the Jagadguru of the Śringeri Śarada Pītham from ca. 1374-1380 until 1386. However, this has been contested by various scholars.

In the course of his sketches Madhava frequently explains at length obscure details in the different systems. The systems are arranged from the Advaita-point of view. According to Sarvepalli Radhakrishnan, the Sarvadarśanasaṅgraha "sketches sixteen systems of thought so as to exhibit a gradually ascending series, culminating in the Advaita Vedanta (or non-dualism)."

Author 
The Text is usually attributed to Mādhavāchārya. Mādhavāchārya is usually identified with Vidyāranya, the Jagadguru of the Śringeri Śarada Pītham from ca. 1374-1380 until 1386. According to tradition, Vidyaranya helped establish the Vijayanagara Empire sometime in 1336, and served as a mentor and guide to three generations of kings who ruled over the Vijayanagara Empire. Vidyaranya is thought to have been named Madhava before taking ordination as a sannyasin. However, Vidyaranya's authorship of the text has been contested by various scholars.

Some accounts identify Madhavacharya or Vidyaranya with Madhava, the brother of Sāyaṇa, a Mimamsa scholar from the Vijayanagara Empire. In his attempt to clarify the identification of Madhava with Vidyaranya, Narasimhachar (1916, 1917) named this Madhava [B], distinguishing him from Madhava [A], a device also followed by Rama Rao (1930; 1931; 1934), and Kulke (1985). Mid 14th century, Madhava [B] served as a minister in the Vijayanagara Empire, and wrote several works, including, according to Rama Rao, the Jivanmuktiviveka, a work usually attributed to Vidyaranya, due to his identification with Madhava [B]. According to the Sringeri account, the brothers Madhava and Sayana came to Vidyaranya to receive his blessings, and completed his unfinished Veda bhashyas.

While usually attributed to Madhava [B], and thereby to Vidyaranya, Madhava [B] was probably not the author of the Sarvadarśanasaṅgraha. According to Clark, the author may have been Channibhatta (Chinna or Chennu):

Chapters 
The sixteen systems of philosophy expounded by Madhava in the text are:

 Chārvāka
 Buddhism
 Arhata or Jainism
 Ramanuja System or Sri Vaishnavism
 Purna-Prajña Darsana or Tatva-vaada or Dvaita Vedanta
 Nakulisa-Paśupata
 Shaivism
 Pratyabhijña (Kashmir Shaivism) or Recognitive System
 Raseśvara or Mercurial System
 Vaisheshika or Aulukya
 Akshapada or Nyaya
 Jaimini
 Pāṇiniya
 Samkhya
 Patanjala or Yoga
 Vedanta or Adi Shankara

The Sarvadarśanasaṅgraha itself doesn't contain the 16th chapter (Advaita Vedanta, or the system of Adi Shankara), the absence of which is explained by a paragraph at the end of the 15th chapter, (the Patanjali-Darsana). It says: “The system of Shankara, which comes next in succession, and which is the crest-gem of all systems, has been explained by us elsewhere, it is, therefore, left untouched here”.

Madhvacharya tries to refute, chapter by chapter, the other systems of thought prominent in his day. Other than Buddhist and Jaina philosophies, Vidyaranya draws quotes directly from the works of their founders or leading exponents and it also has to be added that in this work, with remarkable mental detachment, he places himself in the position of an adherent of sixteen distinct philosophical systems.

Sarvadarśanasaṅgraha is one of the few available sources of information about lokayata, the materialist system of philosophy in ancient India. In the very first chapter, "The Chārvāka System", he critiques the arguments of lokayatikas. While doing so he quotes extensively from Cārvāka works. It is possible that some of these arguments put forward as the lokayata point of view may be a mere caricature of lokayata philosophy. Yet in the absence of any original work of lokayatikas, it is one of the very few sources of information available today on materialist philosophy in ancient India.

References

Indian philosophy